Enitan Abisogun Bababunmi (born 8 September 1940 – 29 May 2017) was a Nigerian academic and a Professor of Biochemistry who served as the third Vice-Chancellor of Lagos State University between 1993 and 1996.

Recognition
In 2002, Enitan was granted a patent by the United States government after he produced a formulation that would prevent muscle atrophy in AIDS and cancer patients.

Death
He died on 29 May 2017, aged 76.

References

Bibliography

External links
Obituary

1940 births
2017 deaths
Academic staff of the University of Ibadan
Academic staff of Lagos State University
Nigerian biochemists
Vice-Chancellors of Lagos State University
20th-century Nigerian inventors
Scientists from Lagos